The Minstrel Man is a 1981 compilation album by country singer Willie Nelson.

Track listing 
"Good Times"
"Will You Remember Me"
"Laying My Burdens Down"
"Mountain Dew"
"It Should Be Easier Now"
"Minstrel Man"
"Senses"
"You Left Me a Long Long Time Ago"
"Where Do You Stand"
"Blackjack County Chain"

Personnel 
Willie Nelson – Guitar, vocals

1981 compilation albums
Willie Nelson compilation albums
RCA Records compilation albums